Michael D. C. Drout (born 1968) is an American Professor of English and Director of the Center for the Study of the Medieval at Wheaton College. He is an author and editor specializing in Anglo-Saxon and medieval literature, science fiction and fantasy, especially the works of J. R. R. Tolkien and Ursula K. Le Guin.

Career

Drout holds a Ph.D. in English from Loyola University Chicago (May 1997), an M.A. in English from the University of Missouri (May 1993), an M.A. in Communication from Stanford University (May 1991), and a B.A. in Professional and Creative Writing from Carnegie Mellon University.

He is best known for his studies of Tolkien's scholarly work on Beowulf and the precursors and textual evolution of the essay Beowulf: the Monsters and the Critics, published as Beowulf and the Critics by J. R. R. Tolkien (2002), which won the Mythopoeic Award for Scholarship in Inklings Studies, 2003.

He is the editor of the J.R.R. Tolkien Encyclopedia: Scholarship and Critical Assessment (2006), a one-volume reference on Tolkien's works and their contexts.

With the Tolkien scholars Douglas A. Anderson and Verlyn Flieger, he is co-editor of Tolkien Studies: An Annual Scholarly Review, (Volumes 1–7, 2004–2010).

Books
Books written or edited by Michael Drout include:

 2002, (editor), Beowulf and the Critics by J. R. R. Tolkien, Medieval and Renaissance Texts and Studies 248 (Arizona Center for Medieval and Renaissance Studies), Tempe, AZ, 
 2007, (editor), J.R.R. Tolkien Encyclopedia: Scholarship and Critical Assessment (New York; London: Routledge, 2007), ; reprinted 2013,

Audio

Drout has published thirteen audio lectures for Recorded Books' Modern Scholar Series. He has both a love of the Anglo-Saxon language, and academic expertise in its linguistic basis for the modern English Language; he maintains a growing collection of recorded Anglo-Saxon on Anglo-Saxon Aloud.

References

External links
Faculty page at Wheaton College
Michael D. C. Drout's Vita
Tolkien Studies bibliographic information at Muse

Michael D. C. Drout's personal home page

Living people
Tolkien studies
University of Missouri alumni
1968 births
Anglo-Saxon studies scholars
American medievalists
Carnegie Mellon University alumni
American academics of English literature
Wheaton College (Massachusetts) faculty